
Gmina Izabelin is a rural gmina (administrative district) in Warsaw West County, Masovian Voivodeship, in east-central Poland.

Villages
Gmina Izabelin contains the villages and settlements of Hornówek, Izabelin (including the sołectwos called Izabelin B and Izabelin C), Laski, Mościska, Sieraków and Truskaw.

Neighbouring gminas
Gmina Izabelin is bordered by the city of Warsaw and by the gminas of Czosnów, Leszno, Łomianki and Stare Babice.

References

Polish official population figures 2006

Izabelin
Warsaw West County